Svetlana Igorevna Konovalova (born February 10, 1990) is a Russian paralympic cross-country skier from Ryazan, Russia who won silver medal at the IPC Biathlon and Cross-Country Skiing World Championships, which were hosted at the 2014 Paralympics in Sochi, on March 8, 2014. On March 20, 2014, she won a gold medal in 12 km sitting biathlon competition by beating Germany's Anja Wicker by 43.1 seconds.

References

1990 births
Living people
Paralympic bronze medalists for Russia
Paralympic gold medalists for Russia
Paralympic silver medalists for Russia
Biathletes at the 2014 Winter Paralympics
Cross-country skiers at the 2014 Winter Paralympics
Russian female biathletes
Russian female cross-country skiers
Paralympic medalists in cross-country skiing
Medalists at the 2014 Winter Paralympics
Paralympic cross-country skiers of Russia
Paralympic medalists in biathlon
Paralympic biathletes of Russia
21st-century Russian women